The following is a list of events affecting Canadian television in 1962. Events listed include television show debuts, finales, cancellations, and channel launches.

Events

Debuts

Ending this year

Births
August 29 - Ian James Corlett, voice actor, writer, musician, author and producer
September 21 - Mark Holden, actor, writer, producer and voice actor

Television shows

1950s
Country Canada (1954–2007)
CBC News Magazine (1952–1981)
Chez Hélène (1959–1973)
Circle 8 Ranch (1955–1978)
Don Messer's Jubilee (1957–1969)
The Friendly Giant (1958–1985)
Hockey Night in Canada (1952–present)
The National (1954–present)
Front Page Challenge (1957–1995)
Wayne and Shuster Show (1958–1989)

1960s
A Kin to Win (1961–1964)
CTV National News (1961–present)
The Nature of Things (1960–present, scientific documentary series)
Razzle Dazzle (1961–1966)
Reach for the Top (1961–1985)
Singalong Jubilee (1961–1974)
Take a Chance (1961–1965)
Telepoll (1961–1965)

TV movies

Television stations

Debuts

Network affiliation changes

See also
 1962 in Canada
 List of Canadian films

References

External links
CBC Directory of Television Series at Queen’s University (Archived March 4, 2016)